Business administration, also known as business management, is the administration of a commercial enterprise. It includes all aspects of overseeing and supervising the business operations of an organization. From the point of view of management and leadership, it also covers fields that include office building administration, accounting, finance, designing, development, quality assurance, data analysis, sales, project management, information-technology management, research and development, and marketing.

Overview 
The administration of a business includes the performance or management of business operations and decision-making, as well as the efficient organization of people and other resources to direct activities towards common goals and objectives. In general, "administration" refers to the broader management function, including the associated finance, personnel and MIS services.

Administration can refer to the bureaucratic or operational performance of routine office tasks, usually internally oriented and reactive rather than proactive. Administrators, broadly speaking, engage in a common set of functions to meet an organization's goals. Henri Fayol (1841-1925) described these "functions" of the administrator as "the five elements of administration". According to Fayol, the five functions of management are planning, organizing, commanding, coordinating, and controlling. Without proper business management a firm cannot utilize it's resources properly so, it is the most important term in running a business firm.

Academic degrees

Bachelor of Business Administration 

The Bachelor of Business Administration (BBA, B.B.A., BSBA, B.S.B.A., BS, B.S., or B.Sc.) or Bachelor of Commerce (Bcom. or BComm) is a bachelor's degree in commerce and business administration. The duration of the degree is four years in the United States and three years in Europe. The degree is designed to give a broad knowledge of the functional aspects of a company and their interconnection, while also allowing for specialization in a particular area. The degree also develops the student's practical, managerial and communication skills, and business decision-making capability to succeed in the competitive world. Many programs incorporate training and practical experience, in the form of case projects, presentations, internships, industrial visits, and interaction with experts from industry.

Master of Business Administration 

The Master of Business Administration (MBA or M.B.A.) is a master's degree in business administration with a significant focus on management. The MBA degree originated in the United States in the early-20th century, when the nation industrialized and companies sought scientific approaches to management. The core courses in an MBA program cover various areas of business such as accounting, finance, marketing, human resources, and operations in a manner most relevant to management analysis and strategy. Most programs also include elective courses.

Doctor of Business Administration 

The Doctor of Business Administration (DBA, D.B.A., DrBA, or Dr.B.A.) is a research doctorate awarded on the basis of advanced study and research in the field of business administration. The D.B.A. is a terminal degree in business administration, and is equivalent to the Ph.D. in Business Administration.

PhD in Management 

The PhD in Management is the highest academic degree awarded in the study of business management. The degree is intended for those seeking academic research- and teaching-careers as faculty or professors in the study of management at business schools worldwide.

Doctor of Management 

A newer form of a management doctorate is the Doctor of Management (D.M., D.Mgt., DBA, or DMan). It is a doctoral degree conferred upon an individual who is trained through advanced study and research in the applied science and professional practice of management. This doctorate has elements of both research and practice relative to social and managerial concerns within society and organizations.

See also 

 Outline of business administration
 Business economics
 Business informatics
 Business studies

References

Management by type